Seokdae Station is an aboveground station of the Busan Metro Line 4 in Seokdae-dong, Haeundae District, Busan, South Korea.

Station Layout

Gallery

External links

  Cyber station information from Busan Transportation Corporation

Busan Metro stations
Haeundae District
Railway stations opened in 2011